"Into Your Eyes" is the third single from the American DJ Armand Van Helden's sixth album, Nympho (2005). The song's refrain is lifted from "I Might Lie", a 1987 rock hit by Andy Taylor.

Music video
The music video parodies John Carpenter's 1988 film They Live, replacing the aliens by dancing women.  In a key twist, however, the protagonist discovers at the end that he, too, is an alien dancing girl.

Track listing
'''Australian CD single
 "Into Your Eyes" (radio edit)
 "Into Your Eyes" (original mix)
 "Into Your Eyes" (Sant and Matteo Esse Remix)
 "Into Your Eyes" (Sebastien Leger Remix)
 "Into Your Eyes" (The Droyds Delinquent Remix)
 "Into Your Eyes" (Savant Remix)

Charts

Release history

References

External links
 Music video on YouTube

Armand Van Helden songs
2005 singles
2005 songs
Songs written by Andy Taylor (guitarist)
Songs written by Armand Van Helden